Chatham Island, Chatham Islands and similar may refer to:

New Zealand
 Chatham Islands, New Zealand, in the Pacific Ocean (local names Rekohu and Wharekauri)
 Chatham Island, the largest island in the Chatham Islands group

Australia
 Chatham Island (Western Australia), in the Great Southern region

Canada
 Chatham Islands (British Columbia)

Chile
 Chatham Island, Chile

Ecuador
 A former name for San Cristóbal Island, Galapagos, Ecuador

India
Chatham Island (Andaman), part of the Andaman chain

See also
Chatham (disambiguation)